Mano Maritime (Hebrew: מנו ספנות, Mano Sapanut) is a shipping company founded by Moshe Mano and is a subsidiary of the Mano Holdings Group. It operates cargo ships, passenger ships and undertakes other maritime services. The company was ranked in Dun’s top companies in Israel: number 5 in the transportation services

and number 31 in the services companies. 

The company also includes in BDI Code of leading companies in Israel: number 36 in the services companies, 

number 8 in the transportations companies.

and number 187 in the general list

Mano is the owner, chairman, and president of the company.

History
In the 1930s, Moshe’s father, Mordechai Mano (born in Thessaloniki, Greece), immigrated to Israel with his family. His son, Moshe Mano was born in 1955 in Haifa and received education in the field of shipping. In his thirties, he established a shipping company, named Mano Maritime which became an independent company, active both in cruise and cargo shipping. Over the years the company diversified its activities as part of the Mano Holdings Group and has interests in other areas including real estate, hotels and technology.

Cargo Ships and Fleet

Mano Maritime is involved in various fields of the shipping business as owner, operator, and manager of cargo ships. It also offers services in international maritime transport and serves as representative and general agent in Israel for the Japanese shipping company "K" Line and Neptune Line shipping company. Furthermore, it acts as the local agent for various shipping lines based in Spain, Russia, Ukraine, Greece, and Germany. Mano Maritime also transports coal to the Israel Electric Corporation’s power plants in Israel.

Mano Maritime owns 50% of the shares of Crown Shipping, the remaining 50% are owned by the Borchard family of England. Crown Shipping is the representative and general agent in Israel of Ocean Network Express Corporation- “ONE”.

Cruise Ship
 has been managed by the company since 2018. 
During the cruise season in Israel, which usually lasts from March through November, the ship cruises along the coasts of the Mediterranean, the Black Sea and to various destinations in Europe.

Current fleet

Former fleet

See also

Transportation in Israel

References

External links

 Mano Holdings

Cruise lines
Shipping companies of Israel
Travel and holiday companies of Israel